Sinendé  is a town, arrondissement, and commune in the Borgou Department of central  Benin. The commune covers an area of 2289 square kilometres and as of 2013 had a population of 91,672 people.

References

Communes of Benin
Populated places in Benin